Bothriembryontidae is a family of air-breathing land snails, terrestrial pulmonate gastropod mollusks in the superfamily Orthalicoidea.

Taxonomy 
This family has been named Placostylidae and had no subfamilies (according to the taxonomy of the Gastropoda by Bouchet & Rocroi, 2005).

Breure et al. (2010) moved Prestonella and Bothriembryon to Placostylidae.

Breure & Romero (2012) confirmed previous results from 2010 and they renamed Placostylidae to Bothriembryontidae.

 subfamily Bothriembryontinae Iredale, 1937
 subfamily Placostylinae Pilsbry, 1946 - for species from New Zealand and Melanesia

Prestonellinae was formally described as a new subfamily within Bothriembryontidae in 2016. Therefore three subfamilies are recognized in Bothriembryontidae:
 subfamily Bothriembryontinae Iredale, 1937
 subfamily Placostylinae Pilsbry, 1946
 Prestonellinae van Bruggen, Herbert & Breure, 2016

Genera
Genera within the family Bothriembryontidae include:

Bothriembryontinae
 Bothriembryon - the type genus of the family Bothriembryontidae

Placostylinae
 Archaeostylus Brook & Hayward, 2022
 Aspastus Albers, 1850
 Basileostylus F. Haas, 1935
 Callistocharis Pilsbry, 1900
 Diplomorpha Ancey, 1884
 Eumecostylus Martens in Albers, 1860
 Euplacostylus Crosse, 1875
 Leucocharis Pilsbry, 1900
 Placocharis Pilsbry, 1900
 Placostylus Beck, 1837 - the type genus of the (sub)family Placostylidae
 Poecilocharis Kobelt, 1891
 Quiros Solem, 1959
 Santacharis Iredale, 1927

Prestonellinae
 Discoleus Breure, 1978
 Plectostylus Beck, 1837
 Prestonella Connolly, 1929 - type genus of the subfamily Prestonellinae

A cladogram based on nuclear ITS2, 28S rRNA and histone 3 (H3) and sequences of mitochondrial cytochrome-c oxidase I (COI) genes showing phylogenic relations of Bothriembryontidae by Breure & Romero (2012):

Distribution 
Bothriembryontidae have Gondwanan distribution.

References

Further reading 
  Neubert E. & Janssen R. (2004). "Die Typen und Typoide des Natur-Museums Senckenberg, 84: Mollusca: Gastropoda: Pulmonata: Orthalicoidea: Bulimulidae (2), Orthalicidae, Placostylidae". Archiv für Molluskenkunde 133: 193-297. abstract.
  Pilsbry H. A. (1900). Manual of Conchology, structural and systematic, with illustrations of the species. Second series: Pulmonata. Volume 13. Australasian Bulimulidae: Bothriembryon, Placostylus. Helicidae: Amphidromus. 253 pp., 72 plates.

External links